Dirty Power is the third studio album by guitarist Shane Theriot. It was released in 2009.

Track listing

 Old Men (5:21)
 Dirty Power (3:39)
 Four On the Floor (3:50)
 Bring It (3:46)
 Mr. Ed (3:54)
 Buckshot (4:36)
 Memphis (4:20)
 Buckshot (Reprise) (0:49)
 The Pygmy Love Dance (4:21)
 Kirk's Little Backpack (3:04)

Personnel

 Jim Keltner - drums
 Hutch Hutchinson - bass
 Shane Theriot - bass, guitar, baritone guitar, composer, mixing, producer
 Richie Hayward - drums
 Johnny Neel - keys
 Sonny Landreth - guitar
 Zigaboo Modeliste - drums
 Doug Belote - drums
 Adam Nitti - bass
 Johnny Vidacovich - drums
 Kirk Joseph - sousaphone
 Mark Braud - trumpet
 Big Sam Williams - trombone
 Roderick Paulin - sax
 Neal Cappellino, Jack Miele- engineer/mixing

References

External links
 shanetheriot.com

2009 albums